Piața Iancului is a metro station in Bucharest. It is located in the Iancului district near the Iulia Hasdeu National College, on the Pache Popescu/Șoseaua Iancului – Șoseaua Mihai Bravu junction. Lines served by STB are 1, 10, 46 and 55 (trams), 135, 311, 330 and 335 (buses). The N102 also comes here at night.

The station was opened on 17 August 1989 as part of the extension from Gara de Nord to Dristor.

References

Bucharest Metro stations
Railway stations opened in 1989
1989 establishments in Romania